Time to Kill is a 1989 Italian drama film starring Nicolas Cage, and Italian actors Ricky Tognazzi and Giancarlo Giannini. It is directed by Giuliano Montaldo. The film is set in 1936, when Ethiopia was under Italian invasion, and was filmed in Zimbabwe. It is based on the novel with the same name written by Ennio Flaiano.

Plot
Lieutenant Silvestri suffers a toothache and decides to reach the nearest camp hospital earlier. En route to the camp his vehicle has an accident, and stops near a rock. Silvestri continues by walking, but no physician is found at the construction site. He is directed by a young man on an allegedly shorter route to the main camp, and on his way through the jungle he meets and rapes a young Ethiopian woman.  She stays with him afterwards and he gives her his watch as a present. While taking refuge in a cave Silvestri shoots at a hyena, but the bullet ricochets and hits the woman. He buries her, trying to hide all traces, observing some Ethiopian people arriving nearby. Silvestri continues to the dentist at the main camp, where he tells the story to his superior, who decides to do nothing.

Later his unit kills people in retribution of attacks of insurgents in the same area where all that happened and he recognizes the young man from the constructions site and some of the civilians he observed among the dead. He also meets Elias, wearing his pants, which he seems to have forgotten at the site and Johannes, Elias' father.

He finally receives his permission for furlough and while celebrating with his friend and a superior Major he learns that the white turban of the girl means her being leprous. This and a festering wound on his hand lead him to believe he has leprosy. Elias visits him and he concludes him being Mariams brother and Johannes her father and his belief in enforced by Elias' reluctant answers. He seeks out a doctor with the cover-story of investigating for a book. The doctor explains to him from a book all the signs of lepra, which convinces and horrifies him even more. Upon the doctor insisting on examining his hand he gives the doctor a false name and even shoots at him, going to the ship going to Italy.

As he tries to escape from Ethiopia to his wife in Italy, Silvestri evades and even steals from his former and finally hides at the father of the girl, Johannes. After living through a real or imagined illness, Johannes explains to him that Mariam wasn't ill and in exchange he tells her father how she really died, leading him also to the burial site.

The movie switches back to the actual history of Ethiopia for some moments and Silvestris former friend tells the aftermath.

Cast
 Nicolas Cage as Lt. Enrico Silvestri
 Ricky Tognazzi as Mario
 Giancarlo Giannini as Major (Cesare)
 Patrice Flora Praxo as Mariam
 Gianluca Favilla as Army Driver
 Georges Claisse as Dr. Tiberi
 Robert Liensol as Joannes

References

External links

1989 films
Films directed by Giuliano Montaldo
Films set in 1936
Films set in Ethiopia
Films scored by Ennio Morricone
1989 drama films
Films based on Italian novels
Films about rape
Films shot in Almería
English-language Italian films
1980s English-language films